Charly Charrier (born 27 May 1986) is a French footballer who plays as a midfielder for La Roche VF.

Career
On 27 April 2012, he scored his first goal in Ligue 2 with Guingamp in a 1–0 win over CS Sedan Ardennes. During the last 5 games of the 2011–2012 season, he scored 3 goals and added 2 assists, convincing his club to offer him a new two-year-contract.

On 25 September 2018, Charrier signed for Les Herbiers VF.

References

External links
 
 
 
 

1986 births
Living people
Association football midfielders
French footballers
AS Cannes players
En Avant Guingamp players
Luçon FC players
Amiens SC players
Les Herbiers VF players
La Roche VF players
Ligue 1 players
Ligue 2 players
Championnat National players
Championnat National 2 players
Championnat National 3 players